Anjozorobe is a large town in the Analamanga Region, Madagascar, approximately 90 kilometers north-east of the capital Antananarivo.
It has a population of 24,117 inhabitants in 2018.  

Anjozorobe-Angavo Reserve is one of the last high plateau forest in Madagascar. Another high plateau forest is located in the protected area of Ambohitantely.

Routes
The town is linked with Antananarivo by the National Road 3.

Rivers
The Mangoro River has it sources in the commune.

Nature reserves
The Anjozorobe-Angavo Reserve is situated approximately 11 km East of the town.

References

External links
 Conservation of the Anjozorobe Forest Corridor
 FANAMBY Conservation in Anjozorobe

Populated places in Analamanga
Important Bird Areas of Madagascar